Paul J. Ray is an American attorney and government official who served as the Administrator of the Office of Information and Regulatory Affairs (OIRA) from 2020 to 2021.

Early life and education 
Ray is a native of Chattanooga, Tennessee. Paul J. Ray is the son of the late Joe Ray, a teacher, and his wife DeLora. He has a brother and a sister. Following their father's premature death his mother brought the children up as a single mother. Ray earned a Bachelor of Arts in English from Hillsdale College and Juris Doctor from Harvard Law School.

Career 
After graduating from law school, Ray clerked for Samuel Alito on the Supreme Court of the United States. He then worked as an attorney at Sidley Austin in Washington, D.C., specializing in federal agency proceedings. After Neomi Rao, the previous administrator of the Office of Information and Regulatory Affairs, was successfully nominated to the United States Court of Appeals for the District of Columbia Circuit, Ray was selected to serve as acting administrator in December 2019. Donald Trump later nominated Ray to serve as administrator. On December 17, 2019 the Senate Homeland Security and Governmental Affairs Committee voted 8-4 to send Ray's nomination to the full Senate. On January 9, 2020 the United States Senate confirmed Paul Ray with 50-44 votes as head of the Office of Information and Regulatory Affairs. Ray took up office having served only just under a year at OIRA, which regulatory experts found reflected in his very limited background on dealing with regulatory issues; and whilst noting his young age and showing little similarity with some of the previous postholders, experts warned against underestimating him.

Before his time at the Office of Management and Budget, Ray was Counselor to the Secretary of Labor, responsible for the supervision of regulatory reform efforts.

Ray left OIRA office on January 20, 2021. In February 2021, it was announced that he would partner with the Texas Public Policy Foundation. Ray was appointed senior adviser at Patomak Global Partners, a financial services consulting firm.

See also 
List of law clerks of the Supreme Court of the United States (Seat 8)

References 

Administrators of the Office of Information and Regulatory Affairs
Tennessee lawyers
Hillsdale College alumni
Harvard Law School alumni
Trump administration personnel
Place of birth missing (living people)
Date of birth missing (living people)
Living people
Year of birth missing (living people)
Law clerks of the Supreme Court of the United States